Penedo Furado is a waterfall and lake located in the parish of Vila de Rei, in Vila de Rei Municipality in the Castelo Branco, Portugal.

Description

The area of Penedo Furado is one of the most attractive sights of the small town Vila de Rei at the centro Region, Portugal, where you can find a river beach, hidden by the thick vegetation, which ends in a waterfall. The water there is incredible clear and flows through the rocks. This place have several waterfalls in the rivers that run through the Vila de Rei municipality.

This area has a beach on the river where you can do various aquatic activities such as canoeing, there are also ways to practice walk that connects the waterfall, the beach and all this beautiful mountain area.

Penedo Furado belongs to the portuguese long and short trails route ideal to trail running

References

Waterfalls of Portugal

Tourist attractions in Portugal
Trails